Vanda Baranović-Urukalo (born 3 October 1971 in Šibenik, SFR Yugoslavia) is a former Yugoslavian and Croatian female basketball player.

External links
Profile at fiba.com

1971 births
Living people
Basketball players from Šibenik
Croatian women's basketball players
Yugoslav women's basketball players
ŽKK Gospić players
ŽKK Novi Zagreb players
ŽKK Šibenik players
Mediterranean Games gold medalists for Croatia
Mediterranean Games medalists in basketball
Competitors at the 1997 Mediterranean Games
Competitors at the 2001 Mediterranean Games